The men's mass start at the 2019 KNSB Dutch Single Distance Championships in Heerenveen took place at Thialf ice rink on 30 December 2018. There were 25 participants.

Result 

Source:

References

Single Distance Championships
2019 Single Distance